In mathematics, a differential operator is an operator defined as a function of the differentiation operator. It is helpful, as a matter of notation first, to consider differentiation as an abstract operation that accepts a function and returns another function (in the style of a higher-order function in computer science).

This article considers mainly linear differential operators, which are the most common type. However, non-linear differential operators also exist, such as the Schwarzian derivative.

Definition

An order- linear differential operator is a map  from a function space  to another function space  that can be written as:

 
where  is a multi-index of non-negative integers, and for each ,  is a function on some open domain in n-dimensional space. The operator  is interpreted as 

 

Thus for a function :

The polynomial p obtained by replacing D by variables  in the differential operator P is called the total symbol of P; i.e., the total symbol of P above is:

where

Examples

 In applications to the physical sciences, operators such as the Laplace operator play a major role in setting up and solving partial differential equations.
 In differential topology, the exterior derivative and Lie derivative operators have intrinsic meaning.
 In abstract algebra, the concept of a derivation allows for generalizations of differential operators, which do not require the use of calculus. Frequently such generalizations are employed in algebraic geometry and commutative algebra.  See also Jet (mathematics).
 In the development of holomorphic functions of a complex variable z = x + i y, sometimes a complex function is considered to be a function of two real variables x and y. Use is made of the Wirtinger derivatives, which are partial differential operators:  This approach is also used to study functions of several complex variables and functions of a motor variable.

History
The conceptual step of writing a differential operator as something free-standing is attributed to Louis François Antoine Arbogast in 1800.

Notations
The most common differential operator is the action of taking the derivative. Common notations for taking the first derivative with respect to a variable x include:

When taking higher, nth order derivatives, the operator may be written:

The derivative of a function f of an argument x is sometimes given as either of the following:

 
 

The D notation's use and creation is credited to Oliver Heaviside, who considered differential operators of the form

 

in his study of differential equations.

One of the most frequently seen differential operators is the Laplacian operator, defined by

Another differential operator is the Θ operator, or theta operator, defined by

This is sometimes also called the homogeneity operator, because its eigenfunctions are the monomials in z:

In n variables the homogeneity operator is given by

As in one variable, the eigenspaces of Θ are the spaces of homogeneous functions. (Euler's homogeneous function theorem)

In writing, following common mathematical convention, the argument of a differential operator is usually placed on the right side of the operator itself.  Sometimes an alternative notation is used: The result of applying the operator to the function on the left side of the operator and on the right side of the operator, and the difference obtained when applying the differential operator to the functions on both sides, are denoted by arrows as follows:

Such a bidirectional-arrow notation is frequently used for describing the probability current of quantum mechanics.

Del

The differential operator del, also called nabla, is an important vector differential operator. It appears frequently in physics in places like the differential form of Maxwell's equations. In three-dimensional Cartesian coordinates, del is defined as

Del defines the gradient, and is used to calculate the curl, divergence, and Laplacian of various objects.

Adjoint of an operator

Given a linear differential operator 

the adjoint of this operator is defined as the operator  such that

where the notation  is used for the scalar product or inner product.  This definition therefore depends on the definition of the scalar product (or inner product).

Formal adjoint in one variable 

In the functional space of square-integrable functions on a real interval , the scalar product is defined by

where the line over f(x) denotes the complex conjugate of f(x).

This formula does not explicitly depend on the definition of the scalar product.  It is therefore sometimes chosen as a definition of the adjoint operator.  When  is defined according to this formula, it is called the formal adjoint of T.

A (formally) self-adjoint operator is an operator equal to its own (formal) adjoint.

Several variables 

If Ω is a domain in Rn, and P a differential operator on Ω, then the adjoint of P is defined in L2(Ω) by duality in the analogous manner:

for all smooth L2 functions f, g.  Since smooth functions are dense in L2, this defines the adjoint on a dense subset of L2:  P* is a densely defined operator.

Example 
The Sturm–Liouville operator is a well-known example of a formal self-adjoint operator.  This second-order linear differential operator L can be written in the form

 

This property can be proven using the formal adjoint definition above.

 

This operator is central to Sturm–Liouville theory where the eigenfunctions (analogues to eigenvectors) of this operator are considered.

Properties of differential operators

Differentiation is linear, i.e.

where f and g are functions, and a is a constant.

Any polynomial in D with function coefficients is also a differential operator. We may also compose differential operators by the rule

Some care is then required: firstly any function coefficients in the operator D2 must be differentiable as many times as the application of D1 requires. To get a ring of such operators we must assume derivatives of all orders of the coefficients used. Secondly, this ring will not be commutative: an operator gD isn't the same in general as Dg. For example we have the relation basic in quantum mechanics:

The subring of operators that are polynomials in D with constant coefficients is, by contrast, commutative. It can be characterised another way: it consists of the translation-invariant operators.

The differential operators also obey the shift theorem.

Several variables

The same constructions can be carried out with partial derivatives, differentiation with respect to different variables giving rise to operators that commute (see symmetry of second derivatives).

Ring of polynomial differential operators

Ring of univariate polynomial differential operators

If R is a ring, let  be the non-commutative polynomial ring over R in the variables D and X, and I the two-sided ideal generated by DX − XD − 1. Then the ring of univariate polynomial differential operators over R is the quotient ring . This is a  simple ring. Every element can be written in a unique way as a R-linear combination of monomials of the form . It supports an analogue of Euclidean division of polynomials.

Ring of multivariate polynomial differential operators

If R is a ring, let  be the non-commutative polynomial ring over R in the variables , and I the two-sided ideal generated by the elements 

for all  where  is Kronecker delta. Then the ring of multivariate polynomial differential operators over R is the quotient ring 

This is a  simple ring.
Every element can be written in a unique way as a R-linear combination of monomials of the form

Coordinate-independent description
In differential geometry and algebraic geometry it is often convenient to have a coordinate-independent description of differential operators between two vector bundles.  Let E and F be two vector bundles over a differentiable manifold M. An R-linear mapping of sections  is said to be a kth-order linear differential operator if it factors through the jet bundle Jk(E).
In other words, there exists a linear mapping of vector bundles

such that

where  is the prolongation that associates to any section of E its k-jet.

This just means that for a given section s of E, the value of P(s) at a point x ∈ M is fully determined by the kth-order infinitesimal behavior of s in x. In particular this implies that P(s)(x) is determined by the germ of s in x, which is expressed by saying that differential operators are local. A foundational result is the Peetre theorem showing that the converse is also true: any (linear) local operator is differential.

Relation to commutative algebra
An equivalent, but purely algebraic description of linear differential operators is as follows: an R-linear map P is a kth-order linear differential operator, if for any k + 1 smooth functions  we have

Here the bracket  is defined as the commutator

This characterization of linear differential operators shows that they are particular mappings between modules over a commutative algebra, allowing the concept to be seen as a part of commutative algebra.

Variants

A differential operator of infinite order 
A differential operator of infinite order is (roughly) a differential operator whose total symbol is a power series instead of a polynomial.

Bidifferential operator 
A differential operator acting on two functions  is called a bidifferential operator. The notion appears, for instance, in an associative algebra structure on a deformation quantization of a Possion algebra.

See also

 Difference operator
 Delta operator
 Elliptic operator
 Curl (mathematics)
 Fractional calculus
 Invariant differential operator
 Differential calculus over commutative algebras
 Lagrangian system
 Spectral theory
 Energy operator 
 Momentum operator
 DBAR operator
 Pseudo-differential operator
 Fundamental solution

References

Further reading

External links

Operator theory
Multivariable calculus